Tarbat Kandi (also Romanized as Tarbat Kandī; also known as Tīrbīt) is a village in Aslan Duz Rural District, Aslan Duz District, Parsabad County, Ardabil Province, Iran. At the 2006 census, its population was 505, in 101 families.

References 

Towns and villages in Parsabad County